The Streatham Black Hawks are an amateur ice hockey team based in Streatham, England. They currently play in the NIHL 2 South Division. Previously named the Streatham Hawks in the 2019-2020 season, they rebranded as the Black Hawks for the 2021-2022 season. The Streatham Black Hawks are the senior affiliate of the Streatham Youth Ice Hockey Club.

Season-by-season record

Club roster 2021–22

2020/21 Outgoing

References 

Ice hockey teams in England
Streatham